Saturday Review was a weekly radio programme broadcast on BBC Radio 4 which "offers sharp, critical discussion of the week's cultural events", according to the show's website.

The show was presented by Tom Sutcliffe. It was replaced in 2021.

References

External links
Saturday Review website

BBC Radio 4 programmes